

Biography 
Melanie (Mel) Poole is an Australian producer and writer. She has run her own production company, called Production Hut, since 2006. She is also the co-founder of a film production company called 18° Entertainment based in Queensland.

Career 
Poole began her career working as a journalist and producer for Australia's national breakfast television program Today Show on Channel Nine. During this time, she directed a number of commercials. She has also worked as a journalist for Australia ABC Radio and Channel Ten. Under the name Melanie Kent, she has been a travel writer for various publications including Australia's largest circulating travel newspaper section News Ltd ESCAPE, one of her bigger articles being her recap of her trek to the Everest Base Camp.

In 2012, Poole was a co-producer, with Dan Macarthur on a film called The Suicide Theory, directed by Dru Brown and starring Steve Mouzakis and Leon Cain. In the film, a suicidal man wants to end his life after losing his wife to an accident. In order to follow through with his death wish he hires a hitman to kill him. Unfortunately it does not go as planned and he manages to survive every attempt. The two characters form an unlikely bond during the circumstances.

In 2013, Poole teamed up with Macarthur again and they co-wrote and produced a comedic gangster film called Nice Package. The film is 18° Entertainment first production and was funded by Poole and Macarthur themselves. The film stars Dwayne Cameron, Leon Cain (returning from previous involvement), Ashley Lyons and new actress Isabella Tannock. The story follows an amateur thief who wants to escalate his thefts, as he is hiding the sexy, femme fatale hostage at his gay best friend's house after running into her when he steals a mysterious package. The trio then has to deal with the thugs hired to get the package back to the owner. Poole also has a small role in the film. The film is slated for a 2016 release after Poole and Macarthur spent time at the American Film Market, located in Los Angeles, trying to promote it at festivals, hoping that it would catch on. From their early screenings to local markets, the response was warm and positive giving the duo hope of success for the film. The secondary goal of the film is to get other filmmakers to recognize their production company and hopefully help them expand in the Australian and American film markets.

As of 2013, Poole is currently doing work on a television show called Planet of Love, working alongside Canon to document how love and marriages are viewed in different countries and cultures around the world.

Also as of 2013, Poole and Macarthur are also filming in India, collaborating again on a Bollywood film.

Filmography

References

Australian film producers
Australian women film directors
Australian film directors
Living people
Year of birth missing (living people)